The Clambakes Series Volume 3 is the most recent in a series of limited edition Live albums by Superchunk known as the Clambakes series. Released in 2004 The Clambakes Series Volume 3 (limited to 2,000 copies) is a live set recorded at the Cat's Cradle in Carrboro, North Carolina on July 23, 1999 for the Merge Records ten-year anniversary celebration.

Track listing
 "Unbelievable Things"
 "Cursed Mirror"
 "Skip Steps 1 & 3"
 "Throwing Things"
 "Hello Hawk"
 "Smarter Hearts"
 "Nu Bruises"
 "The Question is How Fast"
 "Watery Hands"
 "Pink Clouds"
 "Driveway to Driveway"
 "Hyper Enough"
 "Martinis on the Roof"
 "Like a Fool"
 "Slack Motherfucker"
 "Cast Iron"
 "Precision Auto"

2004 albums
Superchunk albums